María Esther de Jesús Scherman Leaño (born 5 January 1957) is a Mexican politician affiliated with the Institutional Revolutionary Party. As of 2014 she served as Deputy of the LIII, LV and LIX Legislatures of the Mexican Congress as a plurinominal representative and as Senator of the LIV Legislature.

References

1957 births
Living people
Politicians from Guadalajara, Jalisco
Women members of the Senate of the Republic (Mexico)
Members of the Senate of the Republic (Mexico)
Members of the Chamber of Deputies (Mexico)
Institutional Revolutionary Party politicians
20th-century Mexican politicians
20th-century Mexican women politicians
21st-century Mexican politicians
21st-century Mexican women politicians
Members of the Constituent Assembly of Mexico City
Women members of the Chamber of Deputies (Mexico)
University of Guadalajara alumni